Zachary is a male given name.

Zachary may also refer to:

People with the surname
 Beulah Zachary (1911 – 1959), American television director and producer
 Hugh Zachary, (1928–2016), American novelist
 Jason Zachary (born 1977), American politician
 Joseph Zachary, American computer scientist and professor
 Lee Zachary (born 1946), American politician
 Mia Zachary, American author
 Robert Zachary (1913–1999), surgeon
 Ted Zachary, American movie studio executive
 Valerie Zachary (born 1962), American attorney

Other uses
 Dear Zachary: A Letter to a Son About His Father, a 2008 American documentary film
 Zachary, Louisiana, United States, a city

See also
 Zechariah (disambiguation)
 Zach (disambiguation)
 Zack (disambiguation)
 St John Zachary

Surnames from given names